
The Office of Technical Service (OTS; formerly known as the Technical Services Division and Technical Services Staff) is a component of the U.S. Central Intelligence Agency, responsible for supporting CIA's clandestine operations with gadgets, disguises, forgeries, secret writings, and weapons.  In the 1950s and early 1960s it also researched, investigated, and experimented with the use of drugs, chemicals, hypnosis, and isolation to extract information during interrogation, as well as to make it easier for American captives to resist interrogation. OTS is part of CIA's Directorate of Science and Technology.

Many film makers have been inspired by OTS, although the information around it is kept highly secret, with only dated projects being revealed and much left it up to interpretation.

See also
 Canadian Caper
 Tony Mendez
 CIA cryptonym
 Project MKULTRA
 Sidney Gottlieb
 United States biological weapons program
 Frank Olson
 Jonna Mendez
 Allen Dulles

References

Further reading

External links
 With Release of “Family Jewels,” CIA Acknowledges Years of Assassination Plots, Coerced Drug Tests and Domestic Spying

Central Intelligence Agency